ER1 electric trainset (Cyrillic: ЭР1) was manufactured by Rīgas Vagonbūves Rūpnīca between 1957 and 1962 for suburban commuting usage within the Soviet Union on lines  electrified on 3000 V, DC.

See also
 Stadler KISS - electric trainset, in Sweden called ER1
 The Museum of the Moscow Railway, at Paveletsky Rail Terminal, Moscow
 Rizhsky Rail Terminal, Home of the Moscow Railway Museum
 Varshavsky Rail Terminal, St.Petersburg, Home of the Central Museum of Railway Transport, Russian Federation
 History of rail transport in Russia

 Documentary of Soviet electric EMU trains of the ER-series (ER1 from 38:26-53:07)

Electric multiple units of Russia
Electric multiple units of Ukraine
3000 V DC multiple units